The Toledo Rockets college football team represents the University of Toledo in the Mid-American Conference (MAC). The Rockets compete as part of the NCAA Division I Football Bowl Subdivision. The program has had 27 head coaches since it began play during the 1917 season. Since December 2015, Jason Candle has served as head coach at Toledo.

Eleven coaches have led Toledo in postseason bowl games: Bill Orwig, Skip Stahley, Frank Lauterbur, Jack Murphy, Chuck Stobart, Dan Simrell, Gary Pinkel, Tom Amstutz, Tim Beckman, Matt Campbell, and Candle. Ten of those coaches also won conference championships: Pat Dwyer captured one and Boni Petcoff two as a member of the Northwest Ohio League; Murphy, Stobart, Simrell, Nick Saban, and Pinkel each captured one; Amstutz and Candle two; and Lauterbur three as a member of the Mid-American Conference.

Pinkel is the leader in seasons coached with 10 years as head coach and games won with 73. Nick Saban has the highest winning percentage at 0.818. John Brandeberry has the lowest winning percentage of those who have coached more than one game, with 0.000. Of the 27 different head coaches who have led the Rockets only Pinkel has been inducted into the College Football Hall of Fame.

Key

Coaches

Notes

References

Toledo

Toledo Rockets football